The Estonian Biocentre (EBC) is a genetics and genomics research institute located in Tartu, Estonia. It's a joint venture between the University of Tartu and the National Institute of Chemical Physics and Biophysics. The goal is to promote research and technological development (RTD) of gene and cell technologies in Estonia. The EBC is regulated by a nine-member Scientific Council composed of researchers from the EBC and outside and is advised by an international Advisory Board, currently consisting of five members from different countries.

EBC was established in 1986. The current director of EBC is Prof. Richard Villems.

See also 
 Estonian Genome Project

References

External links

Genetics or genomics research institutions
Research institutes in Estonia
University of Tartu
1986 establishments in Estonia